Manufacturers Building may refer to:
 Manufacturers Building (Rockingham, North Carolina)
Manufacturers Building at the Alaska Yukon Pacific Exposition in Seattle, 1909
Manufacturers Building, a historic building in Pioneer Square (Seattle, Washington)